The Myanmar Ambassador in Ottawa is the official representative of the Government in Naypyidaw to the Government of Canada.

History
Since 1989 Union of Myanmar

List of representatives

References 

 
Canada
Myanmar